The 1979 Giro d'Italia was the 62nd edition of the Giro d'Italia, one of cycling's Grand Tours. The field consisted of 130 riders, and 111 riders finished the race.

By rider

By nationality

References

1979 Giro d'Italia
1979